The 1935 All-Big Ten Conference football team consists of American football players selected to the All-Big Ten Conference teams chosen by various selectors for the 1935 Big Ten Conference football season.

All Big-Ten selections

Ends
 Merle Wendt, Ohio State (AP-1, MJ-1, NEA-1, UP-1)
 Matt Patanelli, Michigan (MJ-1, NEA-2, UP-1)
 Henry W. Longfellow, Northwestern (AP-1, MJ-2, UP-2)
 Trevor J. Rees, Ohio State (NEA-1)
 Frank Loebs, Purdue (MJ-2, UP-2)
 Bob Lannon, Iowa (NEA-2)
 Dwight T. Reed, Minnesota (NEA-3)
 Ray Wallace King, Minnesota (NEA-3)

Tackles
 Ed Widseth, Minnesota (AP-1, MJ-1, NEA-1, UP-1)
 Dick Smith, Minnesota (AP-1, MJ-1, NEA-1, UP-1)
 Charley Hamrick, Ohio State (UP-2)
 Merritt Bush, Chicago (UP-2)
 Chuck Galbreath, Illinois (NEA-2)
 Art Lewis, Ohio (NEA-2)
 Bob Peeples, Marquette (NEA-3)
 Gilbert Harre, Ohio State (MJ-2)
 John Golemgeske, Wisconsin (MJ-2)

Guards
 Paul Tangora, Northwestern (AP-1, MJ-1, UP-1)
 Charles Wilkinson, Minnesota (AP-1, MJ-2, NEA-1, UP-2 [tackle])
 Ed Grybowski, Illinois (MJ-1, NEA-2, UP-1)
 Sid Wagner, Michigan State (NEA-1)
 Vern Oech, Minnesota (NEA-2)
 Jim Karcher, Ohio State (MJ-2, UP-2)

Centers
Gomer Jones, Ohio State (AP-1, MJ-1, NEA-3, UP-1)
 Ted Osmaloski, Iowa (NEA-1)
 Dale H. Rennebohm, Minnesota (MJ-2, NEA-2, UP-2)

Quarterbacks
 Vernal A. "Babe" LeVoir, Minnesota (AP-1, MJ-1, NEA-2, UP-1)
 Stan Pincura, Ohio State (MJ-2, UP-2)
 Cecil Isbell, Iowa (NEA-3)

Halfbacks
 Jay Berwanger, Chicago (AP-1, MJ-1, NEA-1 [quarterback], UP-1)
 Ozzie Simmons, Iowa (AP-1, MJ-1, NEA-1 [fullback], UP-1)
 Andy Pilney, Notre Dame (NEA-1)
 Don Heap, Northwestern (NEA-3, UP-2)
 Wally Cruice, Northwestern (UP-2)
 Ray Buivid, Marquette (NEA-2)
 Dick Heekin, Ohio State (NEA-3)

Fullbacks
 Sheldon Beise, Minnesota (AP-1, MJ-1, NEA-1 [halfback], UP-1)
 Dick Crayne, Iowa (MJ-2 [halfback], NEA-2 [halfback], UP-2)
 George E. Roscoe, Minnesota (MJ-2 [halfback], NEA-2)
 Eddie Jankowski, Wisconsin (MJ-2, NEA-3)

Key

Italics = Player chosen from a team that was not a member of the conference during the 1935 season

Bold = Consensus first-team selection by majority of selectors

AP = Associated Press

MJ = The Milwaukee Journal

NEA = Newspaper Enterprise Association, selected by NEA sports editor Harry Grayson

UP = United Press

See also
1935 College Football All-America Team

References

1935 Big Ten Conference football season
All-Big Ten Conference football teams